7-a-side football at the 2017 ASEAN Para Games will be held from 18 to 22 September 2017 at Field C in Bukit Jalil National sports complex, Kuala Lumpur. There was 1 gold medal in this sport.

Participating teams and officials

Qualifying
A total of five teams will qualify to compete in the football five a side competition. The host nation (Myanmar) automatically qualifies a team. A team may consist of a maximum of 14 athletes.

Squads
The individual teams contact following football gamblers on to:

Group A

Group B

Venues
The venues to be used for all matches were located in National Sports Complex.

Format

The first round, or group stage, was a competition between the six teams divided among two groups of three, where each group engaged in a round-robin tournament within itself. The two highest ranked teams in each group advanced to the knockout stage for the position one to four. the last team of each group plays for the positions 5. Teams were awarded three points for a win and one for a draw. When comparing teams in a group over-all result came before head-to-head.

Classification
Athletes with a physical disability competed. The athlete's disability was caused by a non-progressive brain damage that affects motor control, such as cerebral palsy, traumatic brain injury or stroke. Athletes must be ambulant.

Players were classified by level of disability.
C5: Athletes with difficulties when walking and running, but not in standing or when kicking the ball.
C6: Athletes with control and co-ordination problems of their upper limbs, especially when running.
C7: Athletes with hemiplegia.
C8: Athletes with minimal disability; must meet eligibility criteria and have an impairment that has impact on the sport of football.

Teams must field at least one class C5 or C6 player at all times. No more than two players of class C8 are permitted to play at the same time.

Group stage
The first round, or group stage, have seen the sixteen teams divided into two groups of three teams.

Group A 
In the first group stage have seen the teams in a one group of five teams.

Group B

Knockout stage

Bracket

Semi-final

Finals 

Position 5-6

Bronze Medal Match

Gold Medal Match

Statistics

Ranking

Medalists

See also
Football at the 2017 Southeast Asian Games

References

External links
 Football 7-a-side games result system
7-a-side Football at 2017 ASEAN Para Games, Kuala Lumpur, Official website (football)
7-a-side Football at 2017 ASEAN Para Games of International Federation of Cerebral Palsy Football (IFCPF)

2017
2017 ASEAN Para Games
Football 7-a-side at the ASEAN Para Games
2017 in Asian football